For similarly named ships, see USS Josephine.

USS Josephine H. II (SP-245) was a United States Navy patrol vessel in commission from 1917 to 1918.

Josephine H. II was built as a civilian motorboat of the same name in 1912 by the Bosserdet Yacht and Engine Company. The U.S. Navy acquired her from her owners,  John R. Shuman et al., in July 1917 for World War I service as a patrol vessel. She was commissioned on 3 August 1917 as USS Josephine H. II (SP-245).

Based at Detroit, Michigan, Josephine H. II was assigned to the "9th, 10th, and 11th Naval Districts"—a single administrative entity at the time consisting of the 9th Naval District, 10th Naval District, and 11th Naval District—for duty on the section patrol. She performed guard duty and regulated traffic on the Detroit River and in Lake St. Clair for the remainder of World War I.

Josephine H. II was decommissioned on 29 November 1918. She was returned to Shuman and his co-owners on 11 March 1919.

References

NavSource Online: Section Patrol Craft Photo Archive: Josephine H. II (SP 245)

Patrol vessels of the United States Navy
World War I patrol vessels of the United States
Great Lakes ships
Ships built in Detroit
1912 ships